Agerola is a comune (municipality) in the Metropolitan City of Naples in the Italian region Campania, located about 35 km southeast of Naples. It is part of the Amalfi Coast.

Geography
The municipality of Agerola, situated close to the territory of the Amalfi Coast, contains the frazioni (subdivisions, mainly villages and hamlets) of Bomerano, Campora, Pianillo (communal seat), Ponte, San Lazzaro, and Santa Maria.

Agerola borders on the following municipalities Furore, Gragnano, Pimonte, Positano, Praiano, and Scala.

Twin towns
 San Salvatore Monferrato,  Italy, since 2011

See also
Sorrentine Peninsula
Amalfi Coast

References

External links

 Official website

Cities and towns in Campania